WCBJ (103.7 FM) is a radio station  broadcasting a pop music format. Licensed to Campton, Kentucky, United States.  The station is currently owned by Morgan County Industries, Inc.

References

External links

CBJ
Mainstream adult contemporary radio stations in the United States
Wolfe County, Kentucky
1999 establishments in Kentucky
Radio stations established in 1999